The 1982–83 season was Sport Lisboa e Benfica's 79th season in existence and the club's 49th consecutive season in the top flight of Portuguese football, covering the period from 1 July 1982 to 30 June 1983. Benfica competed domestically in the Primeira Divisão and the Taça de Portugal, and participated in the UEFA Cup after coming in second in previous league.

In the new season, manager Lajos Baróti was replaced by Sven-Göran Eriksson. The Swede released several players from the squad, but only added Diamantino Miranda. The league campaign saw Benfica win the first eleven league games, opening a four-point gap by the end of the first round. In Europe, Benfica progressed through the UEFA Cup, by eliminating Real Betis, KSC Lokeren and FC Zürich. The domestic campaign in the second half of the season was less impressive, with Benfica having three batches of two consecutive draws. In the UEFA Cup, Benfica eliminated Roma in the quarter-finals and Universitatea Craiova in the semis, before they meeting Anderlecht in the UEFA Cup Final. An away loss and home draw cost them the trophy. Still, five consecutive wins in the final five league matches secured the club's 25th Primeira Divisão title. The last match of the season, the Taça de Portugal Final was postponed and only played in the following season.

Season summary
After Lajos Baróti failed to defend retain any of the titles he won in his first season, he was replaced by the 33–year old Sven-Göran Eriksson, who had just won the UEFA Cup. Prior to his signing, Benfica contacted John Bond, but he declined the offer. He arrived on 27 June and pre-season begun two days later, on Tuesday, the 29. Benfica made almost no new signings, other than the return of Diamantino Miranda, so Eriksson sought to reduce the size of the squad which approached 40, with more than 10 players leaving the club in the transfer season. Benfica made their presentation game against Ferencvárosi and competed in the Toronto Tournament in early August.

Benfica started their league campaign by winning their first eleven matches in a row, opening a five-point lead over second place, while scoring 27 goals and conceding only four. Manuel Bento went 565 minutes without conceding from match-day 4 to match-day 8. At the same time, Benfica started the UEFA Cup by eliminating Real Betis and KSC Lokeren. In December, Benfica dropped the first points in the league in a draw in Alcobaça, while in Europe, they knocked-out FC Zürich with 4-0 win at home. On 2 January, Benfica lost for the first time in the Primeira Divisão, in the Derby de Lisboa with Sporting. However they still lapped the first round with a four-point lead over their rivals. On match-day 17, Benfica drew again, now by 2–2 in Bessa, but it did not have any real effect because Porto had also drawn on the same day. On the opening match of February, another draw that cost a point in the title race. Benfica remained erratic, having two more draws in March, followed by a win. In Europe, Benfica faced Roma, one of strongest Italian teams of his era; beating them 2–1 on the Stadio Olimpico. At home, Benfica drew one-equal and eliminate them on aggregate. Filipovic had scored all of Benfica's goals in the tie.

Domestically, in late March, Benfica visited the Estádio das Antas in the Clássico with Porto. A 0–0 draw better suited Benfica, who kept the four point lead over his rival. A few days later, Benfica beat Sporting by 3–0 in the quarter-final of the Taça de Portugal. That game preceded the UEFA Cup tie with Universitatea Craiova that followed, in which Benfica passed on away goals, securing a place in the UEFA Cup Final. On 4 May, Benfica faced Anderlecht on the Heysel Stadium, losing one-nil. On the return leg, two weeks later, Benfica sold-out their stadium and even scored first by Shéu, but the Belgians levelled it only a few minutes later and held on to the draw, winning the competition. Eriksson said: "The party ended up early with that goal from Lozano. We should have played smarter because the fast breaks of Anderlecht were very strong. Patience...". Humberto Coelho said that Benfica rushed to score the second goal, after Sheú's goal, and made a fatal mistake that allowed their opponent to score. João Alves, irritated by not starting, complained of Eriksson choice of the starting eleven. Four days later, Benfica visited Portimonense, where they won 1–0 with a goal from Carlos Manuel on the 85th minute. The win confirmed the 25th league title for the club, after a one-year off. They closed the Primeira Divisão with a four-point lead over Porto, after winning the two remaining games. The season should have concluded with the Portuguese Cup Final which pinned Benfica against Porto in the Estádio Municipal de Coimbra. However, Porto and Porto Football Association started a legal battle with the Portuguese Football Federation to change the venue to Estádio das Antas. It ended up being postponed and only played in August 1983 in Estádio das Antas, with Benfica winning it by 1–0.

Competitions

Overall record

Primeira Divisão

League table

Results by round

Matches

Taça de Portugal

UEFA Cup

First round

Second round

Third round

Quarter-final

Semi-final

Final

Friendlies

Player statistics
The squad for the season consisted of the players listed in the tables below, as well as staff member Sven-Goran Eriksson (manager), Toni (assistant manager), Júlio Borges (Director of Football), Amilcar Miranda (Doctor).

Transfers

In

Out

Out by loan

Notes

References

Bibliography
 
 
 
 

S.L. Benfica seasons
Benfica
Portuguese football championship-winning seasons